Factum Arte is an art conservation company based in Madrid, Milan, and London. Its commercial activity involves assisting contemporary artists to create technically difficult and innovative works of art. It also seeks to promote the use of non-contact 3D digitisation technologies to record museum collections and historic monuments, especially in areas where these are at risk. Since 2009, Factum Arte's non-profit cultural heritage projects have been carried out through the Factum Foundation for Digital Technology in Conservation.

In 2014, Factum Arte completed the installation of an exact facsimile of the tomb of Tutankhamun in the Valley of the Kings in Luxor, near Howard Carter’s house. The facsimile, and its proximity to the original tomb, is intended to provoke a debate about preservation; as Factum Arte's Director, Adam Lowe, was said: "The tomb of Tutankhamun was built to last for eternity, but it wasn't built to be visited".

Factum Arte has worked with institutions such as the British Museum in London, the Musée du Louvre in Paris, the Pergamon Museum in Berlin, the Museo del Prado in Madrid, and the Supreme Council of Antiquities in Egypt.

History
Factum Arte was founded in 2001 by the artists Adam Lowe, Manuel Franquelo, with Fernando Garcia-Guereta to facilitate the recording of the Tomb of Seti I and works with a number of artists including Marc Quinn and Anish Kapoor. The Seti project involved the design and construction of 3D laser scanners, software, and photographic equipment to record the walls of the tomb at high-resolution.

Notable projects

Tomb of Seti I
Factum Arte was founded in 2001 in order to facilitate the development of technology needed specifically for the recording of the Tomb of Seti I.

Tomb of Thutmose III
Factum Arte was commissioned by United Exhibits Group to make a 1:1 facsimile of the Tomb of Thutmose III in 2002. The facsimile was toured at exhibitions in various museums in the United States between November 2002 and December 2007. In 2005 a second facsimile of the tomb was exhibited in Madrid, Edinburgh, and Basel titled Immortal Pharaoh: The Tomb of Thutmose III (Edinburgh) and The Tomb of Thutmose III: The Dark Hours of the Sun (Madrid and Basel).

Tomb of Tutankhamun
In 2012, the company presented its facsimile of the Tomb of Tutankhamun in Cairo.

In 2014 the company installed the facsimile in the Valley of the Kings, beside Howard Carter's house.

The Wedding Feast at Cana
In November 2007, Factum Arte's facsimile of The Wedding Feast at Cana (1563), by Paolo Veronese, was presented by the Cini Foundation in the original location of the painting, the Andrea Palladio's refectory for the Monastery of San Giorgio Maggiore, Venice. The original painting, commissioned in 1562, was plundered by the French Revolutionary Army of Napoleon in 1797 and sent to the Louvre Museum, where it hangs opposite the Mona Lisa. The facsimile was commissioned in 2006 by the Fondazione Giorgio Cini and, following an agreement with the Louvre, Factum Arte's technicians were allowed to scan the painting at night. Corriere della Sera called the facsimile a "turning point in art".

Piranesi
In 2010 the Cini Foundation commissioned the visualisation and manufacture of objects designed by the 18th century artist and antiquarian Giambattista Piranesi. The project was conceived by Adam Lowe, Michele De Lucchi, and John Wilton-Ely and was exhibited in the Cini Foundation on the island of San Giorgio Maggiore for the Venice Biennale. The objects were later toured for exhibitions in Madrid, Barcelona, and San Diego

In March–May 2014, Factum Arte exhibited the series at the Sir John Soane's Museum in London. Diverse Manieri: Piranesi, Fantasy and Excess aimed to explore the relationship between Sir John Soane and Piranesi. The objects were shown in the context of prints, drawings and books in Soane's library.

The manufacture of the objects involved a variety of methods including stereolithography, milling, fused deposition modelling, electro forming and electro plating, in addition to a host of moulding and casting technologies

Polittico Griffoni
The 16 panels of the Polittico Griffoni once formed the altarpiece of the Basilica of San Petronio in Bologna. It was considered one of the greatest altarpieces of the 15th Century Bolognese School. The panels were originally painted by Francesco del Cossa and Ercole De Roberti. The panels, removed in 1725, are now scattered in various museums in Italy, the United Kingdom, the United States, France, the Netherlands, and the Vatican City.

Using the Lucida 3D scanner, designed by Manuel Franquelo, Factum Arte and the Factum Foundation for Digital Technology in Conservation collaborated with San Petronio Basilica to record, reproduce and reunite the panels as a facsimile in their original location.

Technology
Factum Arte has developed a number technologies in order to better facilitate the recording and production of objects.

The Lucida 3D Laser Scanner is capable of scanning surface relief, without contact, and with a depth of field of 2.5 cm at resolution of 100 microns. The scanner is designed to be portable, and easy to set up and operate; with the aim to make the recording of objects and sites more feasible and accessible for both individuals and institutions.
The company's cement printer, designed by engineer Dwight Perry, aims to print a 3 dimensional concrete structure directly from CAD files. A prototype was displayed at the GENESIS exhibition, about genetics, at the Centraal Museum in Utrecht in 2007. In 2009 the artist Anish Kapoor utilized a second prototype of the printer as an investigation into new ways of developing form. Kapoor used the results of his experimentation as a piece, entitled "Greyman Cries, Shaman Dies, Billowing Smoke, Beauty Evoked", in his solo exhibition at the Royal Academy in London. Kapoor's vision and process was detailed in a book Unconformity and Entropy, published by Turner Books in 2010 - . The cement printer is currently undergoing development at Factum Arte's workshop in Madrid.

Criticism
In 2013, when referring to the facsimile of the Tomb of Tutankhamun and the facsimile of the caves at Lascaux, historian Tom Holland voiced criticism of the idea of creating "fakes" as a means to protect the originals:
In our society, there is a huge premium set on authenticity. Clearly, were there not a difference between the copy and the original, it wouldn't matter – you could make a replica and trash the original. Tutankhamun and Lascaux were created by people who believed in the world of the spirits, the dead, and the supernatural. You don't have to believe in a god or gods to feel a place is consecrated and has a particular quality that cannot be reproduced.

References

External links
 
 The Factory of fakes - The New Yorker, November 28, 2016
Technology companies of Spain
Fused filament fabrication